Carla Beth Freedman (born 1963) is an American lawyer who has served as the United States Attorney for the Northern District of New York since October 2021.

Education

Freedman earned a Bachelor of Arts degree from Syracuse University in 1985 and a Juris Doctor from the New York Law School in 1988.

Career

From 1988 to 2004, Freedman was an assistant district attorney in the New York County District Attorney's Office in Manhattan, where she led a unit that focused on investigating organized crime from 1997 to 2004. From 2007 to 2021, she served as Assistant United States Attorney in the United States Attorney's Office for the Northern District of New York. From 2018 to 2021, she was the narcotics chief for the office.

U.S. attorney for the Northern District of New York 

In March 2021, Freedman was recommended to the position of U.S. Attorney by Senator Kirsten Gillibrand. On August 10, 2021, President Joe Biden nominated Freedman to be the United States attorney for the Northern District of New York. On September 30, 2021, her nomination was reported out of committee by voice vote. On October 5, 2021, her nomination was confirmed in the United States Senate by voice vote. On October 8, 2021, Freedman was sworn in as the United States Attorney for the Northern District of New York by Glenn T. Suddaby, the Chief United States District Judge of the United States District Court for the Northern District of New York.  Freedman is the first woman to hold this position.

Personal life 

Freedman is a registered Democrat.

References

External links
 Biography at U.S. Department of Justice

1963 births
Living people
20th-century American women lawyers
20th-century American lawyers
21st-century American women lawyers
21st-century American lawyers
Assistant United States Attorneys
County district attorneys in New York City
New York (state) Democrats
New York (state) lawyers
New York University School of Law alumni
People from Ann Arbor, Michigan
Syracuse University alumni
United States Attorneys for the Northern District of New York